In Greek mythology, Nereus was the eldest son of Pontus (the Sea) and Gaia (the Earth), with Pontus himself being a son of Gaia. Nereus and Doris became the parents of 50 daughters (the Nereids) and a son (Nerites), with whom Nereus lived in the Aegean Sea.

Etymology 
R. S. P. Beekes suggests a Pre-Greek origin.

Mythology 
In the Iliad, the Old Man of the Sea is the father of Nereids, though Nereus is not directly named. He was never more manifestly the Old Man of the Sea than when he was described, like Proteus, as a shapeshifter with the power of prophecy, who would aid heroes such as Heracles who managed to catch him even as he changed shapes. Nereus and Proteus (the "first") seem to be two manifestations of the god of the sea who was supplanted by Poseidon when Zeus overthrew Cronus.

The earliest poet to link Nereus with the labours of Heracles was Pherekydes, according to a scholion on Apollonius of Rhodes.

During the course of the 5th century BC, Nereus was gradually replaced by Triton, who does not appear in Homer, in the imagery of the struggle between Heracles and the sea-god who had to be restrained in order to deliver his information that was employed by the vase-painters, independent of any literary testimony.

In a late appearance, according to a fragmentary papyrus, Alexander the Great paused at the Syrian seashore before the climacteric battle of Issus (333 BC), and resorted to prayers, "calling on Thetis, Nereus and the Nereids, nymphs of the sea, and invoking Poseidon the sea-god, for whom he ordered a four-horse chariot to be cast into the waves."

Nereus was known for his truthfulness and virtue:

The Attic vase-painters showed the draped torso of Nereus issuing from a long coiling scaly fishlike tail.  Bearded Nereus generally wields a staff of authority. He was also shown in scenes depicting the flight of the Nereides as Peleus wrestled their sister Thetis.

In Aelian's natural history, written in the early third century, Nereus was also the father of a watery consort of Aphrodite and lover of Poseidon named Nerites who was transformed into "a shellfish with a spiral shell, small in size but of surpassing beauty."

Nereus was father to Thetis, one of the Nereids, who in turn was mother to the great Greek hero Achilles, and Amphitrite, who married Poseidon.

Notes

References
 Kerényi, Carl, The Gods of the Greeks, Thames and Hudson, London, 1951. Internet Archive.
 Glynn, Ruth, "Herakles, Nereus and Triton: A Study of Iconography in Sixth Century Athens", in the American Journal of Archaeology, vol. 85, no. 2, pp. 121–132. .
 Graves, Robert, The Greek Myths: The Complete and Definitive Edition. Penguin Books Limited. 2017.

External links

 
 Theoi Project, Nereus—the sea-god in classical literature and art

Shapeshifters in Greek mythology
Children of Gaia
Greek sea gods
Mythology of Heracles
Therianthropy